The 2020 Azorean regional election was held on 25 October 2020, to determine the composition of the Legislative Assembly of the Autonomous Region of the Azores. All 57 members of the assembly were up for election.

The Socialist Party (PS) again won the most votes with 39%, but lost their majority against all predictions. The party won 25 seats, 5 seats fewer than in 2016 and 4 seats short of a majority. The Socialists' main opponent, the Social Democratic Party (PSD), made significant gains by winning almost 34% of the votes and 21 seats, two more than in 2016. The CDS – People's Party was able to hold on to its status as the third biggest party in the region but lost almost 2% of the votes and one member on the regional parliament. Overall, CDS–PP got 5.5% of the votes and 3 seats. The Left Bloc (BE) was also able to hold on to their 2016 score, holding their 2 seats and winning a similar share of vote to that received in 2016, with 3.8%. The Unitary Democratic Coalition (CDU) was wiped out from the regional parliament by losing their sole member, elected in 2016, and polling just 1.7% of the votes.

The big surprise in the elections was the arrival of new parties, from left to right, in the Azores regional parliament. CHEGA (CH) polled 5% of the votes and was able to elect 2 members to the regional parliament. People-Animals-Nature (PAN) also elected one MP as did the Liberal Initiative (IL). The new composition of the regional assembly gave the rightwing parties a majority over the left, with 29 against 28. On election night, PSD leader José Manuel Bolieiro said the night was a historic one for democracy and the autonomous region. PS leader Vasco Cordeiro said the PS won the elections and should have a chance to form a government but acknowledged that the picture was challenging. In the days after the election, both PS and PSD started talks with parties to see if deals were possible.

On November 2, PSD, CDS–PP and PPM announced they had reached an agreement to form a government. Shortly afterwards, Carlos Furtardo, the leader of CHEGA also announced the party would support a PSD/CDS–PP/PPM government in the regional Parliament. Despite this announcement, there were divisions in CHEGA as the party's national leader, André Ventura, said no deal had been made with the Social Democrats and that the order was to not support the PSD led coalition. However, a few days later, on November 6, CHEGA and PSD reached an agreement after CHEGA dropped several of their demands. On the next day, November 7, the Representative of the Republic in the Azores, Pedro Catarino, after hearing all parties represented in the regional parliament, appointed José Manuel Bolieiro as President and asked him to form a government. On 24 November, José Manuel Bolieiro and his cabinet were sworn in to office.

The turnout in these elections increased compared to the previous one, with 45.4% of voters casting a ballot, compared with the record-low 40.9% in the 2016 elections.

Electoral system

The 57 members of the Azores regional parliament are elected through a proportional system in which the 9 islands elect a number of MPs proportional to the number of registered voters. MPs are allocated by using the D'Hondt method. 5 members are also elected for a Compensation constituency. Current distribution of MPs by constituency:

Parties
The table below lists parties represented in the Legislative Assembly of the Azores in the term between 2016 and 2020.

Parties running in the election
14 lists were on the ballot for the 2020 Azorean regional election, 13 parties and one coalition only in Corvo. The parties that contested the election and their lead candidates, were: (alphabetically ordered)

 Alliance (A), Paulo Silva
 Left Bloc (BE), António Lima
 Unitary Democratic Coalition (CDU), João Corvelo
 CDS – People's Party (CDS-PP), Artur Lima
 CHEGA (CH), Carlos Furtado
 Liberal Initiative (IL), Nuno Barata
 LIVRE (L), José Manuel Azevedo
 Earth Party (MPT), Pedro Soares Pimenta
 People-Animals-Nature (PAN), Pedro Neves
 Portuguese Workers' Communist Party (PCTP/MRPP), José Afonso Loures
 Social Democratic Party (PSD), José Manuel Bolieiro 
 People's Monarchist Party (PPM), Paulo Estêvão
 Socialist Party (PS), Vasco Cordeiro
 People's Monarchist Party/CDS – People's Party More Corvo (PPM/CDS-PP), Paulo Estêvão

Campaign period

Party slogans

Candidates' debates

Opinion polls

Results

Regional summary

|-
| colspan=11| 
|-
! rowspan="2" colspan=2 style="background-color:#E9E9E9" align=left|Parties
! rowspan="2" style="background-color:#E9E9E9" align=right|Votes
! rowspan="2" style="background-color:#E9E9E9" align=right|%
! rowspan="2" style="background-color:#E9E9E9" align=right|±pp swing
! colspan="5" style="background-color:#E9E9E9" align="center"|MPs
! rowspan="2" style="background-color:#E9E9E9;text-align:right;" |MPs %/votes %
|- style="background-color:#E9E9E9"
! style="background-color:#E9E9E9;text-align:center;"|2016
! style="background-color:#E9E9E9;text-align:center;"|2020
! style="background-color:#E9E9E9" align=right|±
! style="background-color:#E9E9E9" align=right|%
! style="background-color:#E9E9E9" align=right|±
|-
| 
|40,703||39.14||7.3||30||25||5||43.86||8.7||1.12
|-
| 
|35,094||33.74||2.8||19||21||2||36.84||3.5||1.09
|-
| 
|5,739||5.52||1.7||4||3||1||5.26||1.7||0.95
|-
|style="width: 10px" bgcolor=#202056 align="center" | 
|align=left|CHEGA
|5,262||5.06||||||2||||3.51||||0.69
|-
| 
|3,962||3.81||0.1||2||2||0||3.51||0.0||0.92
|-
| 
|2,415||2.32||1.4||0||1||1||1.75||1.7||0.75
|-
|style="width: 10px" bgcolor=#00ADEF align="center" | 
|align=left|Liberal Initiative
|2,012||1.93||||||1||||1.75||||0.91
|-
| 
|2,005||1.93||0.4||0||1||1||1.75||1.7||0.91
|-
| 
|1,741||1.67||0.9||1||0||1||0.00||1.7|||0.0
|-
|style="width: 10px" bgcolor=#6AD1E3 align="center" | 
|align=left|Alliance
|422||0.41||||||0||||0.00||||0.0
|-
| 
|362||0.35||0.1||0||0||0||0.00||0.0||0.0
|-
| 
|157||0.15||0.2||0||0||0||0.00||0.0||0.0
|-
| 
|144||0.14||0.2||0||0||0||0.00||0.0||0.0
|-
|style="width: 10px" bgcolor=white align="center" | 
|align=left|More Corvo (PPM/CDS–PP)
|115||0.11||0.0||1||1||0||1.75||0.0||15.90
|-
|colspan=2 align=left style="background-color:#E9E9E9"|Total valid
|width="50" align="right" style="background-color:#E9E9E9"|100,133
|width="40" align="right" style="background-color:#E9E9E9"|96.28
|width="40" align="right" style="background-color:#E9E9E9"|1.6
|width="40" align="right" style="background-color:#E9E9E9"|57
|width="40" align="right" style="background-color:#E9E9E9"|57
|width="40" align="right" style="background-color:#E9E9E9"|0
|width="40" align="right" style="background-color:#E9E9E9"|100.00
|width="40" align="right" style="background-color:#E9E9E9"|0.0
|width="40" align="right" style="background-color:#E9E9E9"|—
|-
|colspan=2|Blank ballots
|2,618||2.52||0.4||colspan=6 rowspan=4|
|-
|colspan=2|Invalid ballots
|1,247||1.20||1.2
|-
|colspan=2 align=left style="background-color:#E9E9E9"|Total
|width="50" align="right" style="background-color:#E9E9E9"|103,998
|width="40" align="right" style="background-color:#E9E9E9"|100.00
|width="40" align="right" style="background-color:#E9E9E9"|
|-
|colspan=2|Registered voters/turnout
||229,002||45.41||4.6
|-
| colspan=11 align=left | Source: Comissão Nacional de Eleições
|}

Results by constituency

Maps

Notes

References

External links
Comissão Nacional de Eleições
Legislative Assembly of Azores - Official website

Azorean regional election
Regional elections in the Azores